Sixth Floor Jazz is a 1997 CD release by the University of Texas Jazz Orchestra; it was critically acclaimed by All About Jazz.  The recording also features Gunther Schuller conducting and giving commentary to historic works of Duke Ellington and Charlie Barnet during a live concert in 1995.  The CD is unique in featuring Enhanced CD audio and QuickTime video with credits and pictures for the recording sessions.

Background 
This group that comprised the University of Texas Jazz Orchestra (during this time) is noted as one of the top collegiate jazz orchestras in the country having been invited to play at the 1997 International Association for Jazz Education Convention in Chicago. The group heard on this recording also played and recorded with Charlie Haden and Gunther Schuller and performed the commission Ten Gallon Shuffle composed by Toshiko Akiyoshi.  Several members of the group have moved into teaching positions at major universities around the country and others are now established jazz artists.

Reception 
"...Sixth Floor Jazz redeems the promise shown in that earlier scrapbook...A first–class session by an upwardly mobile university–level Jazz ensemble..."

Jack Bowers, All About Jazz

Track listing

Recording Sessions 
 recorded  live and in studio, 1995-1996, The University Of Texas, Austin, Texas

Personnel

Musicians 
Conductors: Rick Lawn, Jeff Hellmer, Gunther Schuller
Guest artist: Mitch Watkins (guitar)
Saxes and woodwinds: Paul Haar, Tommy Poole, Joey Colarusso, Ray Rideout, Mace Hibbard, Colin Mason, Jack Cooper, Greg Kehl Moore, Dylan Russell, Paul White, John Mills.  
Trumpets and flugelhorns: Glenda Smith, Craig Biondi, Billy Hunter, Rick White, Wayne Tice   
Trombones: Brenda Sansig, Jerome Smith, Mike Hoffer, (Gary Smith on Daybreak Express and Gulf Coast Blues)
Guitar: Dave Burdick
Piano: Paul DeCastro 
Bass: Tom Mahalik 
Drums: Mike Keonning, Eric Middleton, Steve Summer

Production 
Recording, mixing, editing, mastering engineers: Andy Murphy, Rick Lawn, Jeff Hellmer
Liner notes: Rick Lawn 
Album design: Jodi Jenkins

References

External links

Sixth Floor Jazz at All Music Guide
 The University of Texas Jazz Orchestra 

1996 albums
Jazz albums by American artists
Big band albums
Mainstream jazz albums